was a town located in Tōhaku District, Tottori Prefecture, Japan.

As of 2003, the town had an estimated population of 4,160 and a density of 42.60 persons per km2. The total area was 97.65 km2.

On March 22, 2005, Sekigane was merged into the expanded city of Kurayoshi.

External links
 Kurayoshi official website 

Dissolved municipalities of Tottori Prefecture
Tōhaku District, Tottori
Kurayoshi, Tottori